Rufino Jiao Santos (August 26, 1908 – September 3, 1973) was the 29th Archbishop of Manila from February 10, 1953, until his death on September 3, 1973, and was the first Filipino elevated to the rank of cardinal.

Biography
Born in Barangay Sto. Niño, Guagua, Pampanga, Santos was the fourth of seven children of Gaudencio Santos, an overseer of farmland near Mount Arayat, and Rosalia Jiao y Romero. Rufino's three elder brothers were Manuel, Emiliano, and Quirino; his three sisters were Clara, Jovita, and Exequiela. Santos, nicknamed "Pinong", grew up in a house located 30 meters from what is now the Immaculate Conception Parish. He was active in church activities as an acolyte, and was later a choir member of the Manila Cathedral School. Two factors influenced his priestly vocation: his stint as an altar server, and the encouragement of Father Jose Tahon, Manila Cathedral's parish priest.

He entered San Carlos Seminary on July 25, 1921, and earned a baccalaureate in canon law in 1929 and a doctorate in sacred theology in July 1931 at the Pontificia Universita Gregoriana. In 1927, the 19-year-old Santos and Leopoldo A. Arcaira, 24—both outstanding students of San Carlos Seminary—were the first recipients of the scholarships at the Pontifical Gregorian University in Rome, Italy.

Santos was granted a papal dispensation to be ordained below the canonical age of 24. On October 25, 1931, two months shy of his 23rd birthday, Rufino J. Santos was ordained a priest at the Basilica of Saint John Lateran in Rome. He then served as an assistant parish priest in Imus, Cavite and as a parish priest in Marilao, Bulacan.

His later successor as archbishop, Cardinal Gaudencio Rosales, said during the Second World War,

Archbishop of Manila
In 1953, Santos was appointed Archbishop of Manila on February 10 and was installed on March 25 of the same year. Pope John XXIII made him a cardinal on March 28, 1960. He was the first native Filipino to become a cardinal. Santos paved the way for the founding of Catholic Charities (eventually known as Caritas Manila) and the reconstruction of St. Paul Hospital (now the Cardinal Santos Medical Center), which was established by the Maryknoll Sisters but was damaged by American bombardment during the Second World War. Santos also re-instituted the Philippine Trust Company and the Catholic Travel Office.

During his years in Manila, he rebuilt the Manila Cathedral, which had been destroyed by Allied bombardment during the 1945 Liberation of Manila. It was dedicated on December 10, 1958. 

Being the Metropolitan Archbishop of Manila, he was one of the 49 bishops and archbishops from the Philippines to attend the Second Vatican Council, thus making him a Council Father. He was a member of the conservative-wing of the Council known as the Coetus Internationalis Patrum, and greatly contributed in the drafting of documents about the Blessed Virgin Mary in the field of Mariology.

He hosted the visit of Pope Paul VI to the Philippines to attend the Asian Bishops' Meeting. Santos served as Archbishop of Manila from 1953 to 1973.

Santos established the church-run Radio Veritas and built important structures including the Our Lady of Guadalupe Minor Seminary along EDSA in Makati City; the Pius XII Catholic Center in Paco, Manila; and Villa San Miguel, the archbishop's palace in Mandaluyong.

Rosales said that Santos was a diabetic and that he suffered from a malignant brain tumor.

He died in Manila on September 3, 1973, eight days after his 65th birthday. Following his death, a diplomatic report from the United States Embassy in Manila assessed his activities:

Santos' opposition to "Social Action" programs, which he frequently expressed in heavy-handed fashion, did much to perpetuate the Catholic Church's image as a conservative organization, allied with the country's economic and social elite.

Legacy 

Santos, the first Filipino cardinal, became the 29th Archbishop of Manila in a post-war scenario that saw a nation plagued with the following: a high dependency on the upper class in the  country's social, economic and political growth; a growing inequality in the distribution of wealth; a critical unfairness in labor, land and tenancy—all catalysts to the resurgence of the communist movement. It was to this disparate social order that Santos spoke upon his installation:

This plan took shape soon after when the cardinal appointed an eleven-man administrative board on October 1, 1953. And so a new era had dawned when the establishment of Caritas Manila (first known as Catholic Charities) brought structure and organization to the way the church's charitable works in the Archdiocese of Manila were being implemented.

The initial years were largely a period of identifying those who needed help the most, prioritizing and allocating medical aid, food and clothing when needed.  These were superseded by programs that harnessed talents and opened up work opportunities for Manila's teeming masses, such as the educational assistance program and job placement program. Nonetheless, it was medical assistance, crisis intervention and emergency relief that had the greatest impact, reaching thousands of the sick and indigent. Santos was "reviled" for his "conservatism on social issues and business acumen" . However, it was his vision and altruism that had made Caritas Manila a success and his most noteworthy accomplishment.

Birth centennial
The CBCP announced that Cardinal Gaudencio Rosales would lead the August 26, 2008 centennial rites for Santos at his hometown of Sto. Nino, Guagua, Immaculate Conception Parish Church. Gloria Macapagal Arroyo was to lead the event by unveiling a historical marker and a 6-foot statue of Santos (sculpted by Edillardo Paras) and donated by Cesar L. Villanueva's wife, Arlyn Sicangco-Villanueva, president of Holy Angel University in Angeles City. The rites also included the exhibit of Cardinal Santos memorabilia, loaned by the Archdiocese of Manila and the Kapampangan Museum at Clark. The bronze statue will sit atop a 7-foot concrete pedestal outside the Rufino J. Cardinal Santos Convention Hall adjacent to the parish church. Villanueva also presented to the President, a copy of the book "Padre Pinong, the First Filipino Cardinal" authored by Francis Musni.

On September 3, 2018, his 45th death anniversary, to commemorate the legacy of Santos, and for the preparation for the 60th anniversary of the renovation of the post-war Manila Cathedral, a Mass and the ceremonial tradition of raising of the galero was officiated by then Archbishop of Manila, Cardinal Luis Antonio Tagle.

See also
Jose Maria Delgado, Philippine Ambassador to the Vatican

References

External links
Rufino Cardinal Santos
First Filipino
Catholic Hierarchy - Rufino Jiao Cardinal Santos † 

1908 births
1973 deaths
Ateneo de Manila University alumni
Filipino cardinals
People from Pampanga
Kapampangan people
Participants in the Second Vatican Council
Coetus Internationalis Patrum
Roman Catholic archbishops of Manila
Cardinals created by Pope John XXIII
20th-century Roman Catholic archbishops in the Philippines
Burials at the Manila Cathedral
Roman Catholic Archdiocese of Manila
Presidents of the Catholic Bishops' Conference of the Philippines